Horup, Hörup, Hørup or Hurup may refer to

Places
 Hörup, a municipality in Schleswig-Holstein, Germany
 Hürup, a municipality in Schleswig-Holstein, Germany
 Hürup (Amt)
 Hurup Thy, a town in Denmark

People with the surname
 Viggo Hørup, a Danish politician